Kehrenbach may refer to:

 Kehrenbach, Melsungen, a district of the town Melsungen in Hesse, Germany
 Kehrenbach (Fulda), a river of Hesse, Germany, tributary of the Fulda